Gerhard Damköhler (16 March 1908 – 30 March 1944) was a German chemist. From 1936 to 1944, Damköhler was the head of chemical reaction engineering at the Institute of Physical Chemistry in Göttingen. Damköhler numbers are named after Damköhler, as is the Gerhard Damköhler medal awarded by the German Association of Chemical and Process Engineering (DVCV).

Biography

Gerhard Damköhler was born on 16 March 1908 in Klingenmunster in West Central Germany, the son of a physician. Following the usual primary and gymnasium education, he enrolled in the summer of 1926 at the University of Munich to study chemistry with A. Sommerfeld, graduating five years later summa cum laude with a doctor of philosophy for a dissertation entitled "Individuality of the Osmotic Behavior of Alkalihalogenides." He remained at the university for three more years as a grant supported research fellow, during which time he began to display a marked ability for developing and applying analytical methods to practical problems in chemical engineering. This work attracted the notice of Arnold Eucken, the director of Göttingen University's Institute of Physical Chemistry, who offered Damköhler a position as an assistant that he took up in December 1934. Damköhler took his own life on 30 March 1944. Part of the reason was the political pressure put on him to contribute to the Luftwaffe's jet engine development program.

Personal life

Damköhler was described as a highly intelligent man who worked "25 hours a day". He was married for seven years and had no children.

Published Work
 The Effect of Turbulence on the Flame Velocity in Gas Mixtures

References

External links 
 Gerhard Damköhler medal winners and guidelines for the award

1908 births
1944 deaths
20th-century German chemists
Fluid dynamicists
1944 suicides
Suicides in Germany